Eduard George Monsels (born 24 January 1948) is a Surinamese former sprinter. He competed in the men's 100 metres at the 1968 Summer Olympics, becoming the first competitor to actually appear for Suriname in the Olympics. He is the brother of sprinter Sammy Monsels. Eddy Monsels studied civil engineering at Leiden University.

References

External links
 

1948 births
Living people
Athletes (track and field) at the 1968 Summer Olympics
Surinamese male sprinters
Olympic athletes of Suriname
Sportspeople from Paramaribo
Leiden University alumni